Ophthalmolycus is a genus of marine ray-finned fishes belonging to the family Zoarcidae, the eelpouts. Its two species are found in the southwestern Atlantic Ocean and the Southern Ocean.

Species
Ophthalmolycus contains the following species:

References

Lycodinae
Taxa named by Charles Tate Regan